Optical Materials Express is a monthly peer-reviewed scientific journal published by The Optical Society. It covers advances in and applications of optical materials, including but not limited to nonlinear optical materials, laser media, nanomaterials, metamaterials and biomaterials. Its  editor-in-chief is Andrea Alù (City University of New York). The founding editor-in-chief was David J. Hagan.

According to the Journal Citation Reports, the journal has a 2021 impact factor of 3.074.

References

External links
 

Optics journals

Materials science journals
English-language journals
Monthly journals
Publications established in 2011
Optica (society) academic journals